Wódka may refer to:
 Wódka, the Polish word for vodka
 Wódka (Vodka), a brand of vodka produced by Polmos Białystok
 Wódka, Łódź Voivodeship (central Poland)
 Wódka, Opole Voivodeship (south-west Poland)